Agnisakshi (English: With Fire As Witness) is a 1999 Indian Malayalam-language spiritual film written and directed by Shyamaprasad, based on the novel of the same name by Lalithambika Antharjanam. It stars Rajit Kapur, Shobana, Srividya, Praveena, Madhupal and Madambu Kunhukuttan. The film premiered at the Soorya Festival on 14 September 1998. Agnisakshi received numerous accolades, including the National Film Award for Best Feature Film in Malayalam and nine Kerala State Film Awards. The film holds the distinction of being the only film to get 9 Kerela State Film Awards.

Plot and themes
Unni marries Devaki in a traditional arranged marriage and brings her into the fold of his Namboothiri illam. Bound by a plethora of traditional beliefs, customs and rituals that constitute life within four walls of the joint family, and also consumed by his commitment to not hurt others by going against any tradition, Unni is unable to be the husband that he would have liked to be. Yet, Unni and Devaki understand and love each other immensely and silently. Guarded by the fortress of tradition, the family remains oblivious to the winds of change sweeping through society. Though Unni is aware, he shuts the door to everything that his family will never be able to comprehend or accept. But Devaki, who is essentially of a different mould, longs to step out into the world — and is finally forced to do so. 

Set in early 1930s, the story develops within walls of a Namboothiri Illam, in the South Indian state of Kerala, against the backdrop of the struggle for freedom from the British rule. The film opens in Haridwar, a holy city, where Thankam, Unni's younger cousin sister [Unni's father's younger brother's daughter (Apfan's daughter). Since Unni's late father was the eldest son in that Namboothiri family, he could marry a Brahmin woman. So Unni's mother was Namboothiri. Only the eldest could marry, and other sons of Namboothiri household could only have "sambandham"s with non-Brahmin women. So Thankam's mother was Nair] has come to immerse Unni's ashes in the Ganga and trace Devaki, who now is an ascetic. The story is revealed through the reminiscences of Thankam, a mute spectator who is caught between these characters and the complexities of their relationship — complexities that can never be relegated to the realms of right and wrong.

Cast
 Shobana as Devaki
 Rajit Kapur as Unni
 Srividya as Thankam
 Praveena as younger Thankam
 Madhupal
 Madampu Kunjukuttan
 Sreenath
 Krishna Kumar

Soundtrack

The album consists of 9 tracks all written (except Aathole and Sa virahe) and composed by Kaithapram Damodaran Namboothiri.

Awards
National Film Awards – 1998
 National Film Award for Best Feature Film in Malayalam

Kerala State Film Awards – 1998
 Best Film
 Best Director - Shyamaprasad
 Best Actor - Rajit Kapur
 Second Best Actress - Praveena
 Best Cinematographer - Azhagappan
 Best Sound Recordist - Krishnanunni, Hussain
 Best Makeup Artist - P. Mani, Vikram Gaekwad
 Best Dubbing Artist - Murali Menon, Vennmani Vishnu
 Best Processing Lab - Gemini Lab

Kerala State Film Critics Awards
 Best Film
 Best Director - Shyamaprasad
 Best Lyrics - Kaithaprom
 Best Actress - Shobana
 Best Cinematographer - Azhagappan
 Best Art Director - Premachandran

Other awards
 Filmfare Award for Best Feature Film (Malayalam)
 Aravindan Puraskar for Best Director - Shyamaprasad
 Gollapudi Srinivas Award for Best Director - Shyamaprasad

References

External links
 
 Agnisakshi at the Malayalam Movie Database

1990s Malayalam-language films
Films scored by Kaithapram Damodaran Namboothiri
Films directed by Shyamaprasad
Films based on Indian novels
Films set in Uttarakhand
Films set in the 1930s
Best Malayalam Feature Film National Film Award winners